Jürg Luchs (born 29 September 1956) is a Swiss former cyclist. He competed in the individual road race and team time trial events at the 1980 Summer Olympics.

References

External links
 

1959 births
Living people
Swiss male cyclists
Olympic cyclists of Switzerland
Cyclists at the 1980 Summer Olympics
Place of birth missing (living people)